Théodore Champion (14 February 1873 – 31 August 1954) was a Swiss cyclist, philatelist and stamp dealer, who was added to the Roll of Distinguished Philatelists in 1937. He was born in Geneva and took French citizenship in 1948.

Cycling
Théodore Champion was among the first generation of Swiss cyclists. Four times - 1892, 1893, 1895 and 1896 - he was Swiss champion in the sprint. In 1895 he was also second in the Swiss Championship road race.

Philately
Theodore Champion was the son of a bank employee and a mother who collected stamps. With his brother Adrien he searched the bins of his father's bank for stamps. It was said that they sold their collection for a large sum of money to show their skeptical father the merits of collecting stamps.

He moved to Paris in 1899 and was employed by Alfred Forbin. In 1902 he bought Forbin's postage stamp dealership so that Forbin could concentrate on fiscal stamps.

Champion was one of the founders of the Paris Postal Museum, to which he left valuable pieces from his collection.

Tributes
Theodore Champion was shown several times on stamps:
Liechtenstein issued a special stamp in 1969
Antigua 1993
Montserrat in 2002 on a block of four stamps in honor of Rowland Hill

References

External links
Information about Champion's cycling career.
http://www.theodorechampion.fr/ Website of the firm Théodore Champion.

Signatories to the Roll of Distinguished Philatelists
1873 births
1954 deaths
French philatelists
Cyclists from Geneva
Swiss male cyclists
French stamp dealers